Zapfendorf is a municipality with market rights in the Upper Franconian district of Bamberg in Bavaria, Germany with roughly 5,000 inhabitants.

Geography
Lying as it did on a transport corridor along the Main running east–west as well as from Thuringia to Bavaria, Zapfendorf in the Main Valley was always a way station. On the Main itself, log drivers floated wood from the Frankenwald (forest) down to the Rhine and even as far as Rotterdam.

Population development
On 30 June 2006, Zapfendorf had 5,063 inhabitants, and on 31 December 2006, 5,083. In the next half year, the figure fell to 5,016 by 30 June 2007.

Constituent communities
Zapfendorf's main and namesake centre is by far the biggest of its Gemeindeteile with a population of 2,796. The community furthermore has these outlying centres, each given here with its own population figure:
 Kirchschletten 113
 Lauf 689
 Oberleiterbach 254
 Oberoberndorf 97
 Reuthlos 93
 Roth 68
 Sassendorf 269
 Unterleiterbach 630
 Weihersmühle 7
(as of 30 June 2005)

History
The place was already settled quite early on, as witnessed by finds from the Bronze Age. Zapfendorf had its first documentary mention in 904. The name stems from “Zapfo” (Dorf means “village” in German), and may well refer to an innkeeper who tapped beer (zapfen means “draw”, as from a beer keg, in German). The original overlords were the Meranians, who were followed by the Truhendingens, who in turn sold the community in 1390 to the High Monastery at Bamberg. Since the Reichsdeputationshauptschluss of 1803, the community has belonged to Bavaria.

On 1 April 1945, a munitions train on a siding in Zapfendorf was struck by low-level bombers. Burning parts of this train rained down on the village and destroyed it utterly, leaving only a few houses unscathed.

In 1955, Zapfendorf was designated a market. In 1972, the communities of Lauf, Oberleiterbach, Kirchschletten, Sassendorf, Reuthlos, Roth and Oberoberndorf were amalgamated with Zapfendorf, as was Unterleiterbach in 1978. Until 1972, Zapfendorf belonged to the Staffelstein district before it passed to the Bamberg district. Today, it is classed as a small centre in the Upper Franconia-West region.

Politics
The first mayor is Michael Senger from the Wählergemeinschaft Sassendorf, elected in 2020.

The community council is made up of 16 members, listed here by party or voter community affiliation, and also with the number of seats that each holds:
 CSU 7
 VU (Wählergruppe Vereintes Umland) 5
 SPD 2
 WS (Wählergruppe Sassendorf) 1
 independent 1

Coat of arms
Zapfendorf's arms might heraldically be described thus: Party per fess gules and Or, gules two cloakpins Or per saltire, Or a lion rampant sable armed and langued gules, thereover a bendlet argent.

Established businesses
In Zapfendorf is found Werk IV of the Bayerische Milchindustrie eGmbH (BMI for short, the “Bavarian Milk Industry”), which was founded in 1952 with the goal of processing and marketing the excess low-fat milk yield.

Within Zapfendorf's municipal limits, one brewery may still be found, the Brauerei Hennemann in the outlying centre of Unterleiterbach. Until a few years ago, the Drei Kronen brewery had also been brewing in Zapfendorf. In Unterleiterbach, there was until the mid-1990s another brewery, the Brauerei Mahkorn.

Sightseeing
In the market community of Zapfendorf stand the following points of interest:
 Valentinskapelle (chapel) by Johann Jakob Michael Küchel
 Schloss Unterleiterbach (castle) in Unterleiterbach
 St.-Laurentius-Kirche (church) in Oberleiterbach with settler Ivo Hennemann's grave, from 1859 to 1897 he was a hermit on the Staffelberg (Lichtenfels district), and the poet Joseph Victor von Scheffel’s friend
 Abtei Maria-Frieden (abbey) in Kirchschletten
 Oberleiterbach with its lovely timber-frame houses won the gold medal in 1977 in the contest Unser Dorf soll schöner werden (“Our village ought to become lovelier”)

References

External links
 Community’s website

Bamberg (district)